Anthony Samuel Aiello (April 28, 1921 – February 24, 2012) was an American football player. 

A native of Monongahela, Pennsylvania, Aiello attended Brookfield High School (Ohio) and played college football for Youngstown. He played professional football in the National Football League (NFL) as a tackle for the Brooklyn Tigers and Detroit Lions. He appeared in five NFL games as a back during the 1944 season.

References

1921 births
2012 deaths
Youngstown State Penguins football players
Brooklyn Tigers players
Detroit Lions players
Players of American football from Pennsylvania
People from Monongahela, Pennsylvania